Heinz Nigg (born 23 August 1949) is a Swiss anthropologist, community artist, and promoter of participatory video. In 1980 he documented the outbreak of the youth riots in Zurich.

Life 
Nigg, citizen from Maienfeld and Zurich, grew up with two siblings in Zurich, Switzerland. His parents come from a working-class family and a farmer's family in Maienfeld, Canton of Grisons. His mother was a housewife and dressmaker, whilst his father worked for a non-profit housing association.

In 1967/68 Nigg spent one year as an exchange student in the US, where he was inspired by the artistic expression and politics of the Counterculture of the 60s – the Hippies and Yippies. From 1969 to 1976 he studied history, political science, and social anthropology at Zurich University. At this time he was also an activist in the youth movement and in the rebellious local art scene. During this period he wrote articles about exhibitions of Minimal and Conceptual art for the Tages-Anzeiger, and for the Kunstnachrichten, a journal of international art. In 1974, he traveled to New York as assistant of Johannes Gachnang, director of the Kunsthalle Bern. There he met the artist On Kawara and received a series of postcards from his project I Got Up. In 1975 Nigg collaborated with Izi Fiszman on the international art event Salto Arte in Brussels.

From 1976 to 1979 Nigg lived in London where he did ethnographic fieldwork on the use of audiovisual tools in Community action and Community organizing, which was published as his dissertation in 1980 in Zurich. The book was widely distributed and discussed in the UK:What Nigg and Wade's research indicates is that video is a medium of rich potential, that is just waiting to be released. They make it clear that were professionals and amateurs have become dedicated to introducing some control over the usually authoritarian medium of TV, and where the monopoly of that resource can be broken down, spirited initiatives are possible. Community Media implies that low-gauge video is far from being just a toy invented to enable the nuclear family better use of programmed TV schedules. From 1979 to 1980 Nigg was a lecturer at the Ethnologisches Seminar of Zurich University. Because of a controversial video documentation about the Zurich youth movement and the Opera-House Riots he was banned from teaching at the university. This case of censorship led to a wave of international solidarity with Dr. Nigg and Prof. Lorenz G. Loeffler, head of the department. Jonathan Benthall, director of the Royal Anthropological Institute of Great Britain and Ireland (RAI) in London:

Dr. Nigg was required to leave the seminar and is no longer, at any rate for the time being, in academic life. What are the main issues? It is implied in some press accounts of the affair that Professor Loeffler is considered to be a political subversive; but as far as I know there is no evidence to support such a charge. He is a serious and distinguished scholar. He gives every impression of being a liberal and a relativist. Nigg's view of the ethics of social research is that the anthropologist's findings should be shared at all stages with the subjects of his research, and that he should identify with their cause if he thinks it a just one. Loeffler agrees with Nigg that the seminar should be free to support the interests of underprivileged groups, even at the expense of scientific purity which he considers to be a fiction.Since 1980 Nigg has been active as a visual anthropologist and community artist. His fields of interest are social movements, participation in urban development, and the documentation of migration and mobility. In 2017 he curated Rebel Video for the Swiss National Museum, an exhibition about the alternative video movements of the 1970s and 1980s in Switzerland and the UK. He mostly works with portraits, based on the methods of Oral History, and he also maintains his involvement in art and photography projects.

Heinz Nigg is father of a son (* 1981) and lives in Zurich, Switzerland.

Publications

In English
Rebel Video. The Video Movement of the 1970s and 1980s. London, Basel , Bern, Lausanne, and Zurich.Zurich 2017, Verlag Scheidegger & Spiess, 
Sans-papiers on their March for Freedom 2014: how refugees and undocumented migrants challenge Fortress Europe. In: Interface. A journal for and about social movements. Vol 7 (1): i–iv (May 2015) Movement practise(s), pp. 263–288.
Youth Protest Media in Switzerland. In: John D.H. Downing (Ed.) Encyclopedia of Social Movement Media. Thousand Oaks, California 2011, SAGE Publications, pp. 555–558, 
Violence and Symbolic Resistance in the Youth Unrest of the Eighties. In: Sønke Gau, Katharina Schlieben. Spectacle, Pleasure Principle or the Carnivalesque? A Reader on Possibilities, Experiences of Difference and Strategies of the Carnivalesque in Cultural/Political Practice. Berlin 2008, b_books, pp. 151–166, 
Together with Graham Wade. Community Media. Community Communication in the UK:video, local TV, film, and photography. A documentary report on six groups. Zurich/London 1980: Regenbogen Verlag,

In German
entrechtet – beraubt – erinnert. Dokumentation über Opfer des Nationalsozialismus mit Bezug zu Zürich. Zürich 2021, edition 8, ISBN 978-3-85990-431-6 With Video (20 mins.) on www.remembered.ch (also with english subtitles)
Video: Ich sehe! Eine Autobiografie, AV-Produktionen Heinz Nigg in Zusammenarbeit mit BoD, Norderstedt 2021, ISBN 978-3-753404-50-9
Rebel Video. Die Videobewegung der 1970er- und 1980er-Jahre. London, Basel , Bern, Lausanne und Zürich. Zürich 2017, Verlag Scheidegger & Spiess, 
Die Achtziger – Porträt einer Bewegung. In: Peter Bichsel, Silvan Lerch. Autonomie auf A4. Wie die Zürcher Jugendbewegung Zeichen setzte. Flugblätter 1979–82. Zürich 2017, Limmat Verlag, S. 233–240, 
Augenöffner: Raubkunst und Fluchtgut erinnern an den Holocaust. In: Thomas Buomberger, Guido Magnaguagno (Hrsg.) Schwarzbuch Bührle. Raubkunst für das Kunsthaus Zürich? Zürich 2015, Rotpunktverlag, pp. 217–231, 
Die Revolution findet auch im Saal statt. In: Urs Kälin, Stefan Keller, Rebekka Wyler (Hrsg.) Hundert Jahre Volkshaus Zürich. Bewegung. Ort. Geschichte. Zürich 2010, hier + jetzt, S. 72–81, 
Die alternative Videobewegung – ein transnationales Phänomen. In: Urs Berger, Ruedi Bind, Julia Zutavern, Adam Szymczxk (Hrsg.): Filmfront(al). Der experimentelle und politische Film der 1970er- und 1980er-Jahre in Basel. Basel 2010, Friedrich Reinhardt Verlag, S. 27–32, 
Global Town Baden. 30 Porträts aus einer urbanen Region. Zürich 2010, Limmat Verlag, 
Gewalt und symbolischer Widerstand in den Jugendunruhen der Achtzigerjahre. In: Sønke Gau, Katharina Schlieben. Spektakel, Lustprinzip oder das Karnavaleske? Ein Reader über Möglichkeiten, Differenzerfahrungen und Strategien des Karnavalesken in kultureller/politischer Praxis. Berlin 2008, b_books, S. 141–150, 
Wir sind wenige, aber wir sind alle. Biografien aus der 68er-Generation in der Schweiz. Zürich 2008, Limmat Verlag, 
Die Xenixen. Vier Porträts aus einem multikulturellen Kino in Zürich. In: Veronika Grob, René Moser, Beat Schneider (Hrsg.) XENIX - Kino als Programm. Zürich 2006, Schüren Verlag, S. 68–93, 
Express yourself. Video als widerständische Praxis in der Jugendbewegung der 1980er-Jahre. In: Andreas Broekmann, Rudolf Frieling (Hrsg.) Bandbreite. Medien zwischen Kunst und Politik. Berlin 2004, Kulturverlag Kadmos, S. 69–74, 
Mappamondo. Textcollage einer kleinen Welterkundung. In: Matthias Michel (Hrsg.): Wissenschaft und Welterzählung: Die narrative Ordnung der Dinge. Edition Collegium Helveticum, Band 1. Zürich 2003, Chronos Verlag, S. 231-33, ISBN 978-3-0340-0643-9
Wir wollen alles, und zwar subito. Die Achtziger Jugendunruhen in der Schweiz und ihre Folgen. Mit Videokompilation auf DVD und Website. Zürich 2001, Limmat Verlag (vergriffen), 
Da und fort. Leben in zwei Welten. Immigration und Binnenwanderung in der Schweiz. Zürich 1999, Limmat Verlag, 
Zusammen mit Martin Heller und Claude Lichtenstein. Letten it be. Eine Stadt und ihr Problem. Zürich 1995, Schriftenreihe 19 des Museums für Gestaltung,
Zusammen mit Margrit Bürer. VIDEO: Praktische Videoarbeit mit Kindern und Jugendlichen. Zürich 1990: Pro Juventute Verlag, vergriffen, 
Zusammen mit Elsbeth Kuchen. "Jungi mached Fernseh!" Videoarbeit mit Kindern und Jugendlichen, Zürich, Sommer 1980. In: CINEMA. Unabhängige schweizerische Filmzeitschrift, 26. Jahrgang, Nummer 3/80, S. 23–31

References

External links 
Heinz Nigg in the British Library
Heinz Nigg in the Deutsche Nationalbibliothek
Heinz Nigg on his website
Crossborder and internal migration in Switzerland 1945-2000: Here and Away. Living in two Worlds

Interviews

 Dominik Landwehr, Digital Brainstorming, 6.9.2017
Michael Spahr, Radio Rabe, 25.8.2017
Rolf Probala, Institut für Sozialanthropologie und Empirische Kulturwissenschaft der Universität Zürich, 21.9.2015
Hannes Hug, Radio SRF Focus, 17.5.2010
Stephan Ramming, WOZ, 23.11.2000

1949 births
Swiss anthropologists
Living people